Hugh Allen Blackwell (born July 14, 1944) is an American politician in Burke County, North Carolina. Blackwell is a member in the North Carolina House of Representatives, District 86, which covers half of Burke County.  A Harvard Law School graduate, Hugh Blackwell is a partner in a law practice based in Valdese.  Blackwell is a board of trustees member for Western Piedmont Community College in Morganton.  He also served as a member on the Burke County School Board before pursuing a political career in state government.

Honors

In 2018, Blackwell was listed as a Champion of the Family in the NC Values Coalition Scorecard.

Electoral history

2020

2018

2016

2014

2012

2010

2008

2006

References

Living people
Republican Party members of the North Carolina House of Representatives
Harvard Law School alumni
1944 births
21st-century American politicians
People from Valdese, North Carolina